Weetulta is a locality in the Australian state of  South Australia located on the Yorke Peninsula.

See also
 List of cities and towns in South Australia

References

Towns in South Australia
Yorke Peninsula